Tomáš Dočekal (born 24 May 1989) is a professional Czech football player who plays as a forward for 1. FK Příbram.

Career

Jablonec
In the summer 2019, Dočekal joined FK Jablonec to play for the clubs B-team.

References

External links
 
 

1989 births
Living people
People from Smržovka
Czech footballers
Czech expatriate footballers
Association football forwards
FK Viktoria Žižkov players
MFK Zemplín Michalovce players
Piast Gliwice players
1. FC Slovácko players
Floridsdorfer AC players
FC ViOn Zlaté Moravce players
GKS Tychy players
Czech First League players
Czech National Football League players
I liga players
Ekstraklasa players
2. Liga (Austria) players
Slovak Super Liga players
Bohemian Football League players
Expatriate footballers in Austria
Expatriate footballers in Slovakia
Expatriate footballers in Poland
Czech expatriate sportspeople in Austria
Czech expatriate sportspeople in Slovakia
Czech expatriate sportspeople in Poland
Sportspeople from the Liberec Region